Arckid was a rock band from the 1990s and 2000s, heavily influenced by David Bowie, Queen and T. Rex. Arckid was composed of Royston Langdon (bass guitar and vocals), Antony Langdon (guitar and vocals), Christian Langdon (guitar and vocals) and Jonny Cragg (drums). They were formed primarily of former members of Spacehog,

History
In 2004, Royston Langdon teamed up with one of the former members of Blind Melon to form the band The Quick. Later, they ran into problems touring with the name, and they decided to rename it The Tender Trio. Ultimately, The Tender Trio broke up on March 2, 2006. Royston, Antony and Christian Langdon then pooled their resources to form Arckid. By June 2006, they had recorded eight songs with Bryce Goggin at Trout Studios in Brooklyn. Jonny Cragg, by then sporting a moustache, joined The Twenty-Twos as their drummer post-Spacehog but has since rejoined the Langdon brothers in Arckid.

At the end of November 2006, Antony Langdon left Arckid on good terms and had devised an alter ego known as Louis Arogant. This project was near completion as a record entitled Victoria: an homage to Langdon's love for his wife, the director Victoria Clay de Mendoza. The album was intended to release at end of 2007, but was never released. He also continued in the production of his television work. Also in the works was an album by Antony Langdon and Joaquin Phoenix. The project was called This Lady is a Tramp and was being mixed by Paul McKenna with help from Creation Records founder Alan McGee and the Charlatans’ Tim Burgess. Antony Langdon was briefly replaced in Arckid by Your Vegas guitarist Mat Steel, who subsequently left Arckid after they shot their first video to rejoin Your Vegas.

Pete Denton of Cube and Kid Symphony fame joined Arckid for a short period of time. The reason for his departure is unknown.

Richard Steel accompanied the three members of Arckid on stage during the Hilfiger Sessions NY and the 2007 Lollapalooza gigs. Steel's current status in the band is unknown.

In July 2008, drummer Jonny Cragg posted on the Arckid MySpace page that Spacehog would be reuniting to begin work on a new record.  They last logged into their Myspace page in March, 2009.

Known Music
Songs
I'll Stick Around
Remains
Disguise My Youth
Germany
Yer Hearts Not In It
Cool Water
Conversation
Narrow Streets
White Knuckle Ride
Girls Like You Like Me
Strange Lands
Guilty
Only Dreaming
Step Into My World
Livin In Sin

English rock music groups
Musical groups from Leeds